A gubernatorial election was held on 10 April 1983 to elect the Governor of Saga Prefecture. Kumao Katsuki was re-elected.

Candidates
 - incumbent Governor of Saga Prefecture, age 67
, age 48

Results

References

Saga gubernatorial elections
1983 elections in Japan